The Akwa Ibom State Ministry of Urban Renewal and Special Duties is the state government's ministry tasked with overseeing the housing and urban renewal sector in the state. They are also charged with the responsibility to plan, devise and implement the state policies on Housing.

One of the Major projects handled by the ministry was the new Secretariat Annex recently commissioned by the Executive Gov. Udom Emmanuel.

See also 
 Akwa Ibom State Ministry of Education

References 

Government ministries of Akwa Ibom State
Akwa Ibom
Akwa Ibom